The 50 kilometre cross-country skiing event was part of the cross-country skiing at the 1924 Winter Olympics programme. The competition was held on Wednesday, 30 January 1924. Thirty-three cross-country skiers from eleven nations competed.

Medalists

Results

The competition began at 8:37 a.m. with the first starter André Bluffet. The last starter was Erkki Kämäräinen at 9:09 a.m. The first finisher was Johan Grøttumsbråten at 12:27:46 p.m. and the event ended with the last finisher Szczepan Witkowski who crossed the finish-line at 3:25:58 p.m.

References

External links
Official Olympic Report
 

Men's 50 kilometre
Men's 50 kilometre cross-country skiing at the Winter Olympics